Wardroper is a surname. Notable people with the surname include:

 John Wardroper (died 1515), English cleric
 Sarah Elizabeth Wardroper (1813–1892), English nurse